Rota or ROTA may refer to:

Places
 Rota (island), in the Marianas archipelago
 Rota (volcano), in Nicaragua
 Rota, Andalusia, a town in Andalusia, Spain
 Naval Station Rota, Spain

People
 Rota (surname), a surname (including a list of people with the name)
 Rota Waitoa (died 1866), New Zealand Anglican clergyman

Arts, entertainment, and media
 Rota (poem), once proposed to be the national anthem of Poland
 Rota, a collection of poems by A. W. Yrjänä
 Rota, a type of round (music)

Organizations
 Rota (formation), an infantry or cavalry unit
 Reach Out To Asia, a non-governmental organization based in Qatar
 Roman Rota, the highest appellate tribunal of the Roman Catholic Church
 Rondas Ostensivas Tobias de Aguiar, a military police force in São Paulo
 Rota Club, a 1659–1660 London debate society
 Royal Rota, the press pool for the British Royal Family

Other uses
 Rota (architecture), a rotating cylinder built into a wall, used for exchanging mail and food with cloistered clergy
 Rota (genus), an extinct sea cucumber; see List of prehistoric sea cucumbers
 Rota (papal signature), a sign which makes up part of the pope's signature
 Róta, a Valkyrie in Norse mythology
 Rota, a term for a schedule (workplace), a list of employees who are working on any given day, week, or month
 Rota, a lion presented to Winston Churchill in 1943
 Rota, the feminine form of the Chilean term roto (literally "broken"), used to refer contemptuously to poor city-dwellers in Chile
 Return on total assets, a financial ratio; See Return on assets 
 Rota Fortunae, a concept in medieval and ancient philosophy
 Rota system, a system of collateral succession
 The Rota, the collection of golf courses that host The Open Championship
  includes the ideogram

See also
 Rotary International, a service club
 Rotavirus, the most common cause of severe diarrhoea among infants and young children
 Roster (disambiguation)
 Rotta (disambiguation)